Mayany de Souza (born ) is a Brazilian indoor volleyball player. She is a current member of the Brazil women's national volleyball team.

Clubs
  São José Vôlei (2014–2015)
  Minas Tênis Clube (2015–2016)
  ABEL Brusque (2016–2017)
  Minas Tênis Clube (2017–2019)
  São Paulo/Barueri (2019–2020)
  Osasco Voleibol Clube  (2020–2021)
  SESI/Vôlei Bauru (2021–)

Awards

Individuals
 2016 U22 South American Championship – "Best Middle Blocker"
 2018 FIVB Club World Championship – "Best Middle Blocker"

Clubs
 2018–19 Brazilian Superliga –  Champion, with Minas Tênis Clube
 2018 South American Club Championship –  Champion, with Minas Tênis Clube
 2019 South American Club Championship –  Champion, with Minas Tênis Clube
 2018 FIVB Club World Championship –  Runner-up, with Minas Tênis Clube

References

External links
 FIVB Biography

1996 births
Living people
Brazilian women's volleyball players
Place of birth missing (living people)
Sportspeople from Rio de Janeiro (state)